Arkadaş Association is an Israel-Turkey friendship organization in Yehud-Monosson, Israel. Arkadaş (pronounced Arkadash) means "friend" in Turkish.

History
Arkadaş Association was founded in 1997 by Eyal Peretz. Its main goals are to preserve Turkish Jewish heritage and promote friendship and tolerance between Israel and Turkey. In 2005, the association established a Turkish Jewish cultural center in Yehud.

A monument to Atatürk in the garden of Arkadaş Association was dedicated on November 2, 2007 in a ceremony attended by the Turkish ambassador to Israel, Namık Tan.

The organization has over 4,000 members since its inception, about 40 volunteers to run its vast operations and its twelve branches throughout the country.

See also
 History of the Jews in Turkey
 Turkish Jews in Israel
 Turkey-Israel relations

References

External links

Israel–Turkey relations
Turkish-Jewish culture in Israel
Turkish diaspora organizations
Turkish communities outside Turkey